Asientos is a municipality in the Mexican state of Aguascalientes. The town of Real de Asientos serves as the municipal seat for the surrounding municipality of Asientos.

Real de Asientos was declared a Pueblo Mágico by the Mexican Secretariat of Tourism (SECTUR) in 2006. As of March 2021 it is one of three Pueblos Mágicos in the state of Aguascalientes.

As of 2010, the municipality had a total population of 45,492.

Other than the town of Real de Asientos, the municipality had 250 localities, the largest of which (with 2010 populations in parentheses) were: Villa Juárez (4,888), Ciénega Grande (3,348), classified as urban, and Guadalupe de Atlas (2,259), Lázaro Cárdenas (1,583), Pilotos (1,331), Bimbaletes Aguascalientes (El Álamo) (1,223), Molinos (1,219), El Tule (1,189), Noria del Borrego (Norias) (1,186), Licenciado Adolfo López Mateos (1,074), and Jarillas (1,041), classified as rural.

Geography

The municipality of Asientos is located in the north-east of the state and has a territorial area of 547.74 kilometres squared which is equivalent to 9.84% of the total area of the state and it has an altitude ranging from 1800 to 2700 metres above sea level.

It borders the municipality of Tepezalá to the north east, the municipality of Pabellón de Arteaga to the west, the municipalities of San Francisco de los Romo and Aguascalientes to the south east and the municipality of El Llano to the south. In the north and east, it borders the state of Zacatecas, specifically the municipalities of Loreto and Villa García; and in the south east, it borders the state of Jalisco, with the municipality of Ojuelos de Jalisco.

Government
The government of the municipality consists of the City Council, which is made up of a municipal president, a trustee and a council composed of nine members, five elected by relative majority and four by proportional representation. The city council is elected by universal, direct and secret vote in elections held on the first Sunday of July of the corresponding year.

References

External links
https://web.archive.org/web/20040611143022/http://www.aguascalientes.gob.mx/estado/m_asie.html
https://web.archive.org/web/20070315094440/http://www.e-local.gob.mx/work/templates/enciclo/aguascalientes/municipios/01002a.htm
https://web.archive.org/web/20070830041302/http://www.aguascalientes.gob.mx/transparencia/otros/municipios/asientos.asp
http://www.arellanomx.net/details.php?image_id=245

Municipalities of Aguascalientes

Pueblos Mágicos